Damu Ridas is the debut album of American  gangsta rap group Damu Ridas, released on September 26, 1995.

Track listing 

1995 debut albums
Damu Ridas albums
G-funk albums